Saint-Mathieu is a municipality situated in the Montérégie administrative region in Quebec, Canada. The population as of the Canada 2016 Census was 2,156. It is part of the Roussillon Regional County Municipality.

Demographics

Population

Language

See also
Les Jardins-de-Napierville Regional County Municipality
Rivière de la Tortue (Delson)
List of municipalities in Quebec

References

Municipalities in Quebec
Incorporated places in Roussillon Regional County Municipality
Greater Montreal